Zadok Casey (March 7, 1796 – September 4, 1862) was an American politician who served as a U.S. representative from Illinois and founded the city of Mount Vernon.

Biography
Zadok Casey was born in Greene County, Georgia. Not much is known about his early life. One story is that, as a young man, he witnessed a murder. Because he did not wish to testify, he fled to the frontier.

Casey served as a U.S. representative from Illinois from 1833 to 1843. He founded the city of Mount Vernon around 1817. He was elected to the Illinois House of Representatives in 1822 and to the Illinois State Senate in 1826, and was elected the fourth Lieutenant Governor in 1830. He served in the Twenty-third United States Congress (1833) through the Twenty-seventh United States Congress (1843). He was a Jacksonian Democrat, and he was elected to his final term as an Independent Democrat. He again served in the Illinois House from 1848 to 1852, serving as speaker in 1852, and in the State Senate from 1860 to 1862.

Casey's popularity among his neighbors was such that he twice received the support of every other voter in Jefferson County — when he ran for the Senate in 1826 and for lieutenant governor in 1830, only one opposing vote was cast in either election, and that vote was Casey's own. He died in Caseyville, Illinois at age 66, and was interred at Old Union Cemetery in Mount Vernon.

Caseyville, Illinois
Caseyville, Illinois, was named after Zadok Casey due to his help to finance the Mississippi and Ohio Railroad which runs through the center of town. Casey Creek, a tributary of the Big Muddy River, is also named for him, as are Casey Middle School and Casey Avenue in Mount Vernon.

References

External links
 
 Perrin, History of Jefferson County, Illinois, 1883

1796 births
1862 deaths
Lieutenant Governors of Illinois
Democratic Party Illinois state senators
Speakers of the Illinois House of Representatives
People from Mount Vernon, Illinois
Illinois Jacksonians
Jacksonian members of the United States House of Representatives
19th-century American politicians
Illinois Independents
Independent Democrat members of the United States House of Representatives
Democratic Party members of the United States House of Representatives from Illinois
People from Greene County, Georgia